USA Saturday Nightmares is an American horror and sci-fi movie showcase series that ran Saturday nights from 1984 to 1994 on the USA Network.

Overview

USA Saturday Nightmares was an unhosted weekly B movie presentation, consisting of a horror or sci-fi movie, followed by an episode of The New Alfred Hitchcock Presents, The Hitchhiker, and/or The Ray Bradbury Theater. Occasionally, the show would run a short film as filler afterward, most notably "The Dummy" and "Living Dolls".

One of the show’s intros featured various scenes from black and white horror films with a creepy voice-over from Alan Kalter (of Late Show with David Letterman fame) followed by ominous laughter. Next, a bumper appears, showing scenes from the movie that would be shown along with bumpers from the episodes that would be shown after the movie. Another intro had the viewer going through a CGI haunted house where the paintings changed to depicted random acts of violence and horror film characters such as Dracula, Michael Myers, Jason Voorhees, and Freddy Krueger.

Movies shown

Most movies shown also appeared on Commander USA's Groovie Movies and USA Sci-Fi Theater.

 A Nightmare on Elm Street
 A Nightmare on Elm Street 2: Freddy's Revenge
 A Nightmare on Elm Street 3: Dream Warriors
 Alien High (AKA Invasion of the Mindbenders)
 Alligator
 Alligator 2: The Mutation
 Alone in the Dark
 An American Werewolf in London
 Andy Warhol's Frankenstein
 The Appointment
 Basket Case
 The Black Cat
 Black Christmas
 Black Roses
 Blind Date (AKA Deadly Seduction)
 Bloodbath at the House of Death
 Blood Beach
 Blood Song (AKA Dream Slayer)
Bloodspell (1988)(AKA The Boy From Hell)
 The Boogeyman
 The Brood
 The Cabinet of Caligari
 Cameron's Closet (AKA Cameron's Terror)
 Captain Kronos, Vampire Hunter
 The Children
 Croaked: Frog Monster from Hell
 The Curse of the Cat People
 Damien: Omen II
 Dark Places
 Daughters of Satan
 Dawn of the Dead
 Day of the Dead
 Dead of Night (AKA Mirror of Death)
 Def-Con 4
 Demonoid
 Demonwarp
 Demon Wind
 The Demon (AKA Midnight Caller)
 The Devil's Gift
 The Devil's Nightmare
 Devil Times Five
 Dogs
 Dracula's Dog
 Edge of Sanity 
 The Evil
 The Exorcist
 Exorcist II: The Heretic
 Eyes of a Stranger
 The Falling (AKA Alien Predators)
 Fiend
 The Final Terror
 Firestarter
 Flesh Eating Mothers
 Forever Evil
 Frankenstein and the Monster from Hell
 Friday the 13th
 Friday the 13th Part 2
 Friday the 13th Part III
 Friday the 13th: The Final Chapter
 Friday the 13th: A New Beginning
 Frightmare (1974 film)
 Fright Night Part 2
 Ghost Story
 Ghoulies II
 Girls Nite Out (AKA The Scaremaker)
 God Told Me To
 Graveyard Shift
 The Great Alligator
 Grotesque
 Hangar 18
 Halloween
 Halloween II
 Halloween III: Season of the Witch
 The Hearse
 Hellraiser
 Hellbound: Hellraiser II
 Hello Mary Lou: Prom Night II
 The Howling
 Howling II: Stirba - Werewolf Bitch
 Howling III
 Howling IV: The Original Nightmare
 House
 House II: The Second Story
 House of the Long Shadows

 The House That Dripped Blood
 The House Where Evil Dwells
 Silent Night, Deadly Night 4: Initiation
 The Intruder Within
 Island Claws
 It's Alive
 It Lives Again
 It's Alive III: Island of the Alive
 Kingdom of the Spiders
 Jaws of Satan (AKA King Kobra)
 The Keep
 The Kindred
 Lady in White
 Laserblast
 Let's Scare Jessica to Death
 Lipstick
 The Loch Ness Horror
 Mako, The Jaws of Death
 Mausoleum
 Midnight
 Monster in the Closet
 Motel Hell
 My Bloody Valentine
 Neon Maniacs
 The Nest
 Night Fright
 Night of the Creeps
 Night of the Demon
 Night of the Living Dead
 976-EVIL
 The Omen
 Omen III: The Final Conflict
 Open House
 The Outing
 The Pack
 Party Line
 Planet of Dinosaurs
 The Possession of Joel Delaney
 Psycho II
 The Psychotronic Man
 Prom Night
 Prom Night III: The Last Kiss
 Q, The Winged Serpent
 Quatermass 2
 Rabid
 Raiders of the Living Dead
 Rawhead Rex
 Razorback
 Remote Control
 Return of the Living Dead
 Return to Horror High
 Rock 'n' Roll Nightmare
 Satanik
 Scalpel
 The Shining
 Shock Waves
 The Skull
 Slugs
 Spookies
 The Stranger
 Tales That Witness Madness
 Thirst
 Tourist Trap
 Toxic Zombies (AKA Blood Eaters and Forest Of Fear)
 Trick or Treat
 Trick or Treats
 The Unseen
 The Understudy: Graveyard Shift II
 The Unholy
 Uninvited
 The Unnamable
 Vampire at Midnight
 Vampire Circus
 Venom
 The Video Dead
 Wavelength
 Waxwork
 Werewolf
 The Whip and the Body
 The Wicker Man
 The Wind (AKA Edge of Terror)
 The Witchmaker (AKA The Legend of Witch Hollow)
 Young Frankenstein
 Zombie Nightmare

References

External links
Saturday Nightmares intro
Saturday Nightmares Promo
 
Vampire At Midnight description
The Witchmaker Description

USA Network original programming
Horror movie television series
1986 American television series debuts
1994 American television series endings